Disney Princess Enchanted Tales: Follow Your Dreams is a 2007 American direct-to-video animated musical film produced by Walt Disney Pictures and Disneytoon Studios. It was the first and only film released for a planned Disney Princess Enchanted Tales series of direct-to-video films, each featuring new stories about the Disney Princesses. It was released on September 4, 2007 by Walt Disney Studios Home Entertainment and Walt Disney Studios Motion Pictures.                                                                                                
                                                                                  
The film features new stories about Princess Aurora from Sleeping Beauty (1959) and Princess Jasmine from Aladdin (1992).

Segments

Keys to the Kingdom 
Keys to the Kingdom features characters from Disney's Sleeping Beauty. King Stefan, Queen Leah, King Hubert, and Prince Phillip have left the kingdom for two days for a Royal Conference, leaving Princess Aurora to reign over it in their absence. The three good fairies, Flora, Fauna, and Merryweather offer to help her, but Aurora declines their offer because she believes she can do it alone. Merryweather gives Aurora her wand in case she needs any assistance and warns her to be very careful with it. The fairies also gave King Hubert his speech, which he forgot. With the assistance of the castle majordomo, Lord Duke, Aurora’s tasks include planning banquets, dealing with peasants, and organizing servants who look after the kitchens and the gardens. Aurora believes she can do her job without the use of the wand, but later at night before bed, Aurora can't help but play with it and uses magic to make herself a big yellow ballgown. Eventually, after a long day dealing with complaints, Aurora gives in and uses the wand to help a local farmer in need of new chickens and pigs. Her magical inexperience leads to unusual consequences, including massive chickens, green pigs, and transforming the farmer into a duck. When Stefan, Hubert, Leah, and Phillip are about to enter the castle from a royal conference, Lord Duke warns them about giant chickens, green pigs, and cows. After Aurora realizes that using the wand was a mistake, she promptly comes up with ideas to solve the problems on her own just before her parents, Duke, Hubert, Phillip, and the fairies arrived, only to see that they were no giant chickens, green pigs, and cows. At the end of the first segment, they attend the royal banquet, hosted by Aurora.

More Than a Peacock Princess 
More Than a Peacock Princess features characters from Disney's Aladdin and takes place sometime after Aladdin and the King of Thieves with Iago and presumably Cassim returning to Agrabah. Princess Jasmine is tired and bored with her usual princess duties. She is no longer satisfied with overseeing shop openings and assisting in the sale of a camel at the local market place. While having her portrait painted as a "Peacock Princess," Jasmine loses patience and says she wants more responsibility. The Sultan gives her the job of "Royal Assistant Educator" at the Royal Academy. Jasmine is thrilled until she meets her pupils. They misbehave, draw on the walls, pillow fight, and throw books. She calls her pet tiger Rajah to scare the children into behaving, but they ignore him before chasing him and Jasmine into the mud and up a tree. Jasmine gives up. Later that night, her lady-in-waiting tells her that she needs patience and perseverance and that with these tools, she can do anything she wants. The next day, Hakeem, the stable boy, seeks Jasmine's help. The Sultan's prized horse, Sahara, is missing from the Stables and if he isn't located, Hakeem will lose his job. Jasmine takes it upon herself, with Carpet, Abu, and Iago's help, to find Sahara and return him to the Palace. Upon returning with Sahara she is able to gain the respect of the students at the school and her father.

Cast 
Susanne Blakeslee as Narrator

Keys to the Kingdom 
Erin Torpey as Princess Aurora
Cassidy Ladden as Princess Aurora (singing)
Corey Burton as King Stefan
Barbara Dirikson as Queen Leah, Flora
Jeff Bennett as Lord Duke, King Hubert, Arguing Neighbor #1, Farmer
Roger Craig Smith as Prince Phillip
Russi Taylor as Fauna
Tress MacNeille as Merryweather
S. Scott Bullock as Arguing Neighbor #2

More Than a Peacock Princess 
Linda Larkin-Vasquez as Princess Jasmine
Lea Salonga as Princess Jasmine (singing)
Jeff Bennett as The Sultan, Painter
Gilbert Gottfried as Iago
Frank Welker as Abu, Raja
Flo Di Re as Aneesa
Zack Shada as Akeem
Tara Strong as Sharma

Songs 
 "Keys to the Kingdom" - Lyrics and Music by Amy Powers and Russ DeSalvo, Performed by Cassidy Ladden
 "Peacock Princess" - Lyrics and Music by Amy Powers and Russ DeSalvo, Performed by Lea Salonga and Gilbert Gottfried
 "I've Got My Eyes on You" - Lyrics and Music by Amy Powers and Russ DeSalvo, Performed by Lea Salonga

Production 
This film was originally intended to be the first of a series of spinoffs "in which short stories about the various princesses from the Disney canon were paired according to some thematic overlap". Originally, the first film in the series, was to be titled A Kingdom of Kindness and feature a completely different Aurora story as well as a story about Belle from Beauty and the Beast rather than Jasmine. Trailers were released for this installment on various Disney DVDs, but it was never released. The second film in the series, referred to simply as Disney Princess Enchanted Tales in previews on various Disney Princess related DVDs, was originally scheduled for a 2008 release. It was to have a new Cinderella story as well as a new Mulan story. It too was never released, due to poor sales of Follow Your Dreams.

The fan blog Antagony & Ecstasy speculates that this specific project was the catalyst for newly appointed Chief Creative Officer for Disney animated projects John Lasseter shutting down and halting all Disneytoon Studios sequel projects that weren't too far into production.

Critical reception 
Common Sense Media assessed that the film had "perseverance lessons for princess fans ages 3-6" and gave it a rating of 2 out of 5 stars. It noted the prevalent themes of "follow your dreams and never give up", the "plucky, brave and determined" role model nature of the princess protagonists, and the notion that "as a Disney property, this film inevitably works as brand reinforcement for the Disney Princess line of products." CineMagazine gave the film a rating of 2 out of 5 stars, noting: "It is unfortunate that the two stories have such varying quality. If it had been a little more balanced then [the film could have] become a great movie. Now it remains weak due to the Sleeping Beauty segment being entirely mediocre and barely worthy of Disney". It concluded that this project was focused on turning a profit than upholding artistic integrity".

Antagony & Ecstasy described it as "the first in an aborted attempt to create a new series of cheap-even-by-the-standards-of-cheapquels videos", and concluded "I cannot entirely hate this dreadful little cast-off. It's too short; it's too ebulliently random; and it might very well be the reason that the Disney sequels were finally strangled to death." AnimatedReviews said "This is Disney Product with a capital P" and "I thought Disney had turned a corner in getting away from this low-level quality, but this is just poor, poor, poor". It added "Personally, I’d like to see this kind of thing where it belongs" which is on a television show called "Disney Princesses, with a new episode with a different Princess every time", as opposed to dressing up things like this, Cinderella II, and Belle’s Magical World as movies.

DVDizzy said "It is hard to praise a pairing of two half-hour "movies", created with standards not much higher than those of a Saturday morning cartoon, that are being marketed as a full-length movie". In a review of the DVD, InsidePulse said "The special features with the games are aimed at girls and Lord knows you won’t enjoy them unless you’re under the age of...6 years." It added that it "does provide a modicum in fun in that it lets us see these winning characters again and more of their lives. But in contrast to the excitement and entertainment of their big screen outings, their lives here are a bit boring and didactic."

Mary Costa, the original voice of Aurora, was not fond of the new film and felt that it did not work.

Awards

Cancelled series 
Initially, after the release of Follow Your Dreams, there was planned to be an entire series of Enchanted Tales direct-to-video film installments. However, after DisneyToon Studios president Sharon Morrill stepped down in June 2007, and the animation studio units under the Walt Disney Company underwent into a corporate restructuring as the Pixar leadership assumed more control, the film series was cancelled.

References

External links 
 
 
 
 

2007 direct-to-video films
Disney direct-to-video animated films
DisneyToon Studios animated films
Enchanted Tales
2000s musical films
Aladdin (franchise)
Sleeping Beauty (1959 film)
Animated anthology films
2000s American animated films
2007 animated films
2007 films
Films about royalty
Films scored by Jeff Danna
2000s English-language films